is a private Japanese university. All of its courses are offered online, although it has a physical campus at Fukuoka, Fukuoka Prefecture. The first president of the university is archeologist Sakuji Yoshimura.

External links
Official website

Private universities and colleges in Japan
Online universities and colleges
Universities and colleges in Fukuoka Prefecture
Distance education institutions based in Japan